"If Tomorrow Never Comes" is the sixth episode of the first season of the American television medical drama Grey's Anatomy, which first aired on American Broadcasting Company (ABC) on Sunday May 1, 2005. The episode was written by Krista Vernoff and was directed by Scott Brazil.

Plot and production
The interns are speechless when a woman comes in with a large, record-breaking tumor, but unfortunately for the woman, her outlook isn't good. Derek and Meredith's jobs are at risk now that Bailey knows about their relationship, and Dr. Bailey makes it clear that Derek better not give Meredith special treatment. Meanwhile, Izzie urges George to ask Meredith out, and Cristina and Burke's relationship continues to progress. 

This was the first episode written by Krista Vernoff. Vernoff has stated that in the original storyline, the woman with the tumor was supposed to live, but when she wrote the script she decided that the character had to die. As the theme of the episode was procrastination, Vernoff stated "the message I wanted to give was not, "Hey it’s okay to put off going to see a doctor for two years cause it all turns out alright in the end".

Reception
The episode debuted on Sunday, May 1, 2005, winning its time slot in the ratings with 18.54 million viewers, an 8.5 average share, and a record high for the show among young adult viewers.  It ranked sixth overall among programs airing that week.  Building on the good ratings of the first five episodes of the show, a few days later, it was announced that the show would be renewed for a second season. In 2006, the Ottawa Citizen described this early episode as "not among Grey's best, but the signs of future greatness are there."  In 2009, Variety called the tumor storyline one of the 10 "most bizarre medical maladies" in the first 100 episodes of the show.

References

External links
 

Grey's Anatomy (season 1) episodes
2005 American television episodes